Phyllonorycter insignitella is a moth of the family Gracillariidae. It is found in all of Europe, except the Balkan Peninsula.

The wingspan is 7–8 mm.
Differs from L. nigrescentella
as follows : forewings more orange -tinged, margins of silvery white markings blacker, basal streak somewhat longer, first costal and dorsal spots more opposite, cilia more sharply barred
with white on second dorsal spot.

The larvae feed on Lathyrus, Medicago lupulina, Ononis repens, Trifolium alpestre, Trifolium medium, Trifolium montanum, Trifolium pratense and Vicia species. They mine the leaves of their host plant. They create a lower surface tentiform mine that occupies only part of a leaflet. In full-grown leaves, the mine is strongly inflated and is largely hidden by the leaf.

References

insignitella
Moths of Europe
Moths described in 1846